Iago Miquel Ibagaza Pawlak (born 5 May 2003) is an Argentine professional footballer who plays as a winger for Greek Super League 2 club Olympiacos B. His father is Ariel Ibagaza.

References

2003 births
Living people
Argentine footballers
Super League Greece 2 players
Olympiacos F.C. players
Association football forwards
Olympiacos F.C. B players
Argentine expatriate sportspeople in Greece
Argentine expatriate footballers
Expatriate footballers in Greece